Grant Township is a township in Russell County, Kansas, United States. As of the 2010 United States Census, it had a population of 186.

History
Grant Township was organized from part of Lincoln Township in 1907. In the decades since, the city of Russell has expanded and annexed portions of Grant Township.

Geography
The township lies in the Smoky Hills region of the Great Plains. The Smoky Hill River runs windingly east in and out of the township, back and forth across the township's southern border, and then forms the eastern portion of the border. Fossil Creek, a tributary of the river, enters the township from the northwest and runs east to immediately south of Russell where it has been dammed to form a small reservoir, Fossil Lake. From the lake, the creek flows southeast, then south across the township to the river. The confluence of the river and another of its tributaries, Big Creek, is located in the far southwestern corner of the township.

Located in central Russell County, it contains no incorporated settlements and borders the city of Russell and Russell Township to the north, Center Township to the east, Fairfield and Lincoln Townships to the south, Winterset Township to the southwest, and Big Creek Township to the west.

Demographics

As of the 2010 census, there were 186 people, 72 households, and 60 families residing in the township. The racial makeup of the township was 95.7% White, 2.7% African American, 0.5% from other races, and 1.1% from two or more races. Hispanic or Latino of any race were 0.5% of the population.

There were 72 households, out of which 27.8% had children under the age of 18 living with them, 70.8% were married couples living together, 4.2% had a male householder with no wife present, 8.3% had a female householder with no husband present, and 16.7% were non-families. 13.9% of all households were made up of individuals, and 8.4% had someone living alone who was 65 years of age or older. The average household size was 2.58, and the average family size was 2.80.

In the township, the population was spread out, with 23.7% under the age of 18, 2.1% from 18 to 24, 21.0% from 25 to 44, 31.2% from 45 to 64, and 22.0% who were 65 years of age or older. The median age was 46.8 years. For every 100 females, there were 93.8 males. For every 100 females age 18 and over, there were 100.0 males.

Education
Grant Township lies within unified school district 407, Russell County Schools.

Transportation
Interstate 70 and U.S. Route 40 run concurrently east–west through the far northern part of the township. U.S. Route 281 runs north–south through the central part of the township, connecting to a network of mostly unpaved county roads laid out in a rough grid pattern across the township. A U.S. 40 business route runs southeast into the northeastern corner of the township, terminating at its interchange with I-70. Pioneer Road, a paved north–south county road, runs straight south from that interchange through the township. Immediately south of the interchange, the old alignment of U.S. 40 runs east from Pioneer Road, parallel to I-70. The north–south Balta-Galatia Road forms the township's western border. Another paved county road, the east–west 4 Corners Road, runs east from U.S. 281 in the southern part of the township.

The Kansas Pacific line of the Union Pacific Railroad runs parallel to I-70 and the U.S. 40 business route through the northeastern corner of the township.

References

Townships in Russell County, Kansas
Townships in Kansas